Centaurus. Journal of the European Society for the History of Science is a quarterly peer-reviewed academic journal covering research on the history of mathematics, science, and technology. It is the official journal of the European Society for the History of Science. The journal was established in 1950. In January 2022, Centaurus was relaunched in open-access format by the ESHS and Brepols as Centaurus. Journal of the European Society for the History of Science. The editor-in-chief is Koen Vermeir (Centre national de la recherche scientifique and Paris Diderot University).

Abstracting and indexing
The journal is abstracted and indexed in:

According to the Journal Citation Reports, the journal has a 2020 impact factor of 0.200.

References

External links
 

History of science journals
Brepols academic journals
Publications established in 1950
English-language journals
Quarterly journals